Basak may refer to:
Basak, Iran, a village in Iran
Basak, Mandaue, a barangay of Mandaue, Province of Cebu, Philippines
Basak, Bais City, a barangay of Bais City, Negros Oriental, Philippines
Başak, a Turkish given name or surname
Basak (surname), a Bengali Hindu family name
Bassac River or Basak
Bosak, a Polish surname
Basak or lakhon bassac, a theatre form in the theatre of Cambodia
Basak Traktor, a Turkish tractor company